Akenese Westerlund is a former Samoan international lawn bowler.

Bowls career
Westerlund has represented Samoa at three Commonwealth Games; in the pairs at the 1994 Commonwealth Games and in the fours at the 1998 Commonwealth Games and 2010 Commonwealth Games.

She won a pairs bronze medal (with Lagi Letoa) at the 1995 Asia Pacific Bowls Championships in Dunedin.

References

Living people
Year of birth missing (living people)
Bowls players at the 1994 Commonwealth Games
Bowls players at the 1998 Commonwealth Games
Bowls players at the 2010 Commonwealth Games
Samoan bowls players